Aristotelia vagabundella is a moth of the family Gelechiidae. It was described by William Trowbridge Merrifield Forbes in 1931. It is found in Puerto Rico.

References

Moths described in 1931
Aristotelia (moth)
Moths of the Caribbean